Jade Warrior may refer to:
Jade Warrior (film), a Finnish-Chinese movie
Jade Warrior (band), an English progressive rock band
Jade Warrior (album), an album by Jade Warrior
Jade Warriors, a webcomic from Red Giant Entertainment
Jade Warriors, a comic book series from Image Comics